Lioscincus vivae is a species of lizard in the family Scincidae. The species is endemic to New Caledonia.

Etymology
The specific name, vivae, is in honor of "Kiwi" botanical collector Vivienne "Viv" Whitaker, who collected the holotype of this species, and is the wife of one of its  describers, Anthony Whitaker.

Habitat

Reproduction
The mode of reproduction of L. vivae is unknown. It may be oviparous or viviparous.

References

Further reading
Sadlier RA, Bauer AM, Whitaker AH, Smith SA (2004). "Two New Species of Scincid Lizards (Squamata) from the Massif de Kopéto, New Caledonia". Proceedings of the California Academy of Sciences 55 (11): 208–221. (Lioscincus vivae, new species, pp. 211–215, Figures 3–7).

Lioscincus
Skinks of New Caledonia
Endemic fauna of New Caledonia
Reptiles described in 2004
Taxa named by Ross Allen Sadlier
Taxa named by Aaron M. Bauer
Taxa named by Anthony Whitaker
Taxa named by Sarah A. Smith